HMS Bombay Castle was a 74-gun third-rate ship of the line of the Royal Navy, launched on 14 June 1782 at Blackwall Yard. She grounded on 21 December 1796 in the shoals of the Tagus River's mouth.

Origins
The British East India Company (EIC) funded the construction of Bombay Castle as a contribution to the war effort.

Bombay Castle was at Plymouth on 20 January 1795 and so shared in the proceeds of the detention of the Dutch naval vessels, East Indiamen, and other merchant vessels that were in port on the outbreak of war between Britain and the Netherlands.

Loss

Bombay Castle was under the command of Captain Thomas Sotheby when she entered the Tagus, having taken a pilot on board. In attempting to avoid the storeship Camel, which had grounded ahead of Bombay Castle, Bombay Castle too grounded. During the subsequent week, attempts were made to float her off after boats had removed her guns and stores, but without success. The navy abandoned her as a wreck on 27 December 1798.

Citations and references
Citations

References

External links
 

Ships of the line of the Royal Navy
Elizabeth-class ships of the line
1782 ships
Ships built by the Blackwall Yard
Maritime incidents in 1796